Cymakra granata is a species of sea snail, a marine gastropod mollusk in the family Mitromorphidae.

Description
The length of the shell attains 10 mm.

Distribution
This marine species occurs in the Sea of Cortez, Western Mexico, and off Panama

References

 McLean, J.H. & Poorman, R. (1971) New species of tropical Eastern Pacific Turridae. The Veliger, 14, 89–113

External links
 

granata
Gastropods described in 1971